is a Japanese action-adventure game  developed by Compile Heart and Tamsoft and published by Idea Factory International. Despite the title, the game is a single-player game with an online cooperative multiplayer option. This is the first Neptunia game to use Unreal Engine 4, as well as the first spin-off game to be released on the PlayStation 4 rather than the PlayStation Vita. It is also the first game that Erin Fitzgerald is not reprising her role as Noire in the English dub, due to the complications with the SAG Contract, and is replaced by Erica Mendez.

Setting
A world known as Gamindustri (ゲイムギョウ界 Geimugyō-kai, a pun on ゲーム業界 Gēmu gyōkai, which is literally "game industry" in Japanese) protected by the divine aegis of the four CPUs (Console Patron Units, the goddesses) and their sisters, the CPU candidates. Most of the game takes place inside "4 Goddesses Online" a recurring fictional multiplayer online role-playing game that has been referenced throughout the series.

The setting of the game is the fantasy land of Alsgard, a vast world surrounded by verdant and gorgeous ocean.

Plot
The four CPUs were able to receive an early access code for the newest installment of the popular online game, "4 Goddesses Online", which uses the real forms of the CPUs as official models. Each CPU logs into the game with their own motives for playing the game.

Upon entering the game, they were approached by the guardian spirit, Bouquet, who is one of the game's non-playable characters that is equipped with the game's advanced artificial intelligence. They were told that they are the Chosen Ones that are tasked to save Alsgard from the Demon King Jester by awakening the four divine Goddesses of legend.

Characters

Unlike the previous Tamsoft-made action games for the series, only the four CPUs, Neptune, Noire, Blanc and Vert, and their sisters Nepgear, Uni, Ram and Rom are the only ones playable, along with the four divine goddesses in the later parts of the story.

Development
The game was announced in March 2016. In March 2017, the game was announced for an October 2017 release in English speaking regions. The game is currently in a broken state & has been since the 2nd update that contained free DLC. Currently it is impossible to purchase any in-game cosmetics. The last reply from the developers was in mid-2019.

Reception and sales
The game was the third best-selling video game in Japan during its debut week, selling 42,508 copies.

References

External links
 Official website

2017 video games
Action role-playing video games
Compile Heart games
Hyperdimension Neptunia games
PlayStation 4 games
Video games about video games
Video games developed in Japan
Windows games
Unreal Engine games